California's 38th State Senate district is one of 40 California State Senate districts. It is currently represented by Democrat Catherine Blakespear of Encinitas.

District profile 
The district encompasses much of coastal San Diego County and Southern Orange County, including suburban and rural areas.

San Diego County – 30.0%
 Carlsbad
 Encinitas
 Del Mar
 La Jolla
 Mission Beach
 Mission Viejo
 Oceanside
 Pacific Beach
 Rancho Santa Fe
 San Diego – 4.8%
 San Onofre
 San Juan Capistrano
 Solana Beach
 Vista

Election results from statewide races

List of senators 
Due to redistricting, the 38th district has been moved around different parts of the state. The current iteration resulted from the 2021 redistricting by the California Citizens Redistricting Commission.

Election results 1994 - present

2022

2018

2014

2010

2006

2002

1998

1994

See also 
 California State Senate
 California State Senate districts
 Districts in California

References

External links 
 District maps from the California Citizens Redistricting Commission

38
Government of San Diego County, California
Government of San Diego
North County (San Diego County)
Carlsbad, California
Encinitas, California
Del Mar, California
Mission Viejo, California
Oceanside, California
Rancho Santa Fe, California
Solana Beach, California
Vista, California